William Raleigh Hull Jr. (April 17, 1906 – August 15, 1977) was a U.S. Representative from Missouri's 6th congressional district.  He was born in Weston, Missouri into a prominent tobacco raising family.  He was co-owner of Hull's Tobacco Warehouse in Weston, director of First National Bank, Leavenworth, Kansas and a mayor of Weston in 1939–1940.  His first term in Congress started on January 3, 1955 and served until January 3, 1973. He was not a candidate for re-election.  He died in Kansas City, Missouri and is buried at Graceland Cemetery in Weston.

Hull did not sign the 1956 Southern Manifesto, and voted in favor of the Civil Rights Act of 1960, the 24th Amendment to the U.S. Constitution, and the Voting Rights Act of 1965, but voted against the Civil Rights Acts of 1957, 1964, and 1968.

References

1906 births
1977 deaths
People from Weston, Missouri
Mayors of places in Missouri
Democratic Party members of the United States House of Representatives from Missouri
20th-century American politicians